In enzymology, a cholest-5-ene-3β,7α-diol 3β-dehydrogenase is an enzyme that catalyzes the chemical reaction

cholest-5-ene-3β,7α-diol + NAD+  7α-hydroxycholest-4-en-3-one + NADH + H+

Thus, the two substrates of this enzyme are cholest-5-ene-3β,7α-diol and NAD+, whereas its 3 products are 7α-hydroxycholest-4-en-3-one, NADH, and H+.

The systematic name of this enzyme class is cholest-5-ene-3β,7α-diol:NAD+ 3-oxidoreductase. This enzyme is also called 3β-hydroxy-Δ5-C27-steroid oxidoreductase. The human version of this enzyme is known as hydroxy-Δ-5-steroid dehydrogenase, 3 β- and steroid delta-isomerase 7 or HSD3B7 which is encoded by the HSD3B7 gene.

Function 

This enzyme belongs to the family of oxidoreductases, specifically those acting on the CH-OH group of donor with NAD+ or NADP+ as acceptor. This enzyme is involved in the initial stages of the synthesis of bile acids from cholesterol and a member of the short-chain dehydrogenase/reductase superfamily. This enzyme is a membrane-associated endoplasmic reticulum protein which is active against 7-alpha hydrosylated sterol substrates.

Clinical significance 

Mutations in the HSD3B7 gene are associated with a congenital bile acid synthesis defect which leads to neonatal cholestasis, a form of progressive liver disease.

See also 

 3-beta-HSD

References 

EC 1.1.1
NADH-dependent enzymes
Enzymes of unknown structure